You're Welcome is the sixth studio album by the American rock band Wavves. The album was released on May 19, 2017 through Ghost Ramp.

Track listing

Reception
The album was met with generally favorable reviews by critics, scoring 71 out of 100 on Metacritic.

Charts

References

2017 albums
Wavves albums